Edgbaston ward is a local government district, one of 40 wards that make up Birmingham City Council.  Edgbaston lies to the south west of Birmingham city centre and is home to the University of Birmingham and the Queen Elizabeth hospital. The ward population at the 2011 census was 24,426.

Ward description
The ward covers an area of west Birmingham, including the districts of Edgbaston and parts of Ladywood. It also covers areas around the University Hospital.

The ward was created in 1838, and has been a ward ever since.

The boundary changes of 1950, transferred an area east of the railway line and north of Church Rd and Priory Rd, was transferred to Market Hall ward. To compensate for the loss of electorate, the ward was extended westwards to take in areas of north Harborne.

The boundary changes of 1962 were a reverse of the 1950 changes. The areas south of Lea Bank and Belgrave Roads from the Market Hall ward. Once again to balance the electorate, the area north of the Hagley Road close to the city boundary at Bearwood, and the area of northern Harborne which had been acquired in 1950 were transferred to Harborne ward.

Politics
The Edgbaston ward is currently represented by two Conservative Councillors; Deirdre Alden (1999-), and Matt Bennett (2015-).

The ward of Edgbaston forms part of the  Parliamentary constituency of Birmingham Edgbaston along with Bartley Green, Harborne, and Quinton, which has been represented by Labour Party MP Preet Gill since 2017.

Election results

2020s

2010s

2000s

References

Wards of Birmingham, West Midlands
Edgbaston